The Apertura 2015 Liga MX Finals was the final of the Apertura 2015 Liga MX season, the top level of the Mexican football.

The final was contested in two-legged home-and-away format between UNAM and UANL. The first leg was hosted by UANL at Estadio Universitario in the Monterrey suburb of San Nicolás de los Garza on December 10, 2015, while the second leg was hosted by UNAM at Estadio Olímpico Universitario in Mexico City on December 13, 2015. Both finalists qualified to the 2016–17 CONCACAF Champions League.

Background
Both clubs only faced each other once before in a league final, the final of the 1977–78 season which UANL won 3–1 on aggregate.

Before reaching this final, UNAM appeared in five finals since the year 2000, four in which they were victorious (Clausura 2004, Apertura 2004, Clausura 2009, and Clausura 2011). The team last won the league title four years earlier when they defeated Morelia to capture the Clausura 2011 title.

This was UANL's third final in a one-year span, the team lost the Apertura 2014 league final and lost the 2015 Copa Libertadores final in that span. The team last won the Liga MX title three years earlier when they defeated Santos Laguna to capture the Apertura 2011 title.

The teams represent the National Autonomous University of Mexico (UNAM) and the Universidad Autónoma de Nuevo León (UANL), which made it the third time two teams representing Mexican universities faced each other in the final.

Rules
The final was played on a home-and-away two-legged basis. Unlike the quarterfinals and semifinals, if the two teams are tied after both legs, the match goes to extra-time and, if necessary, a shootout. There is also no away goals rule and the team's seed in the classification does not matter if the teams tie on aggregate.

Road to the finals

Note: In all results below, the score of the finalist is given first (H: home; A: away).

Matches

First leg

Second leg

4–4 on aggregate. UANL won 4–2 on penalty kicks

References

External links
Liga MX website

 
1
Liga MX seasons
Tigres UANL matches